Reptile Gardens is an animal park located south of Rapid City, South Dakota, on the road to Mount Rushmore National Memorial. The park is open the first Saturday in March through November 30 each year. Reptile Gardens was cited in the 2014 Guinness Book of World Records for being the world's largest reptile zoo. It was re-certified in the 2018 edition.

History
This family-oriented South Dakota attraction was founded by 21-year-old reptile enthusiast Earl Brock and officially opened on June 3, 1937.

Allegedly intrigued by the fear and interest people expressed when faced with a snake, Brock set up a small display of snakes, charging people to see them. After some initial success, Reptile Gardens went through difficult times in the 1940s while Brock was serving with the Army in Europe. Regaining momentum after World War II, the 1950s saw an increase in visitation to the Black Hills. Due to the widening and relocation of Highway 16, a new location and major expansion, including the Sky Dome, were completed in 1965.

Although Earl died in 1993, Reptile Gardens remains a family-owned-and-operated business that houses more species of reptiles than any other zoo or park in the world.

Sky Dome
Opened in 1965 as a new addition to Reptile Gardens, this indoor jungle was virtually unheard of in the US at the time. The Sky Dome was rebuilt after a fire in 1976 destroyed everything except for an old Ponderosa Pine skeleton. The same tree still stands as the centerpiece of the Safari Room on the main level. The new Sky Dome was opened in 1977 with new animals and exotic plants.

Exhibits

Prairie Dog town
Snake Program
Bird Program
Alligator/Crocodile Show
Bald Eagle Exhibit
Sky Dome
Safari Room
Komodo Dragon
Tortuga Falls meditative garden
Living Wall
Giant Tortoise Yard

Conservation/Conservation Green Committee
Reptile Gardens donates to various environmental conservation organizations, including the Charles Darwin Center in the Galapagos Islands. Money donated to these organizations helps to protect natural wildlife.

Educational

During the summer, Reptile Gardens offers educational and interactive animal shows, such as a bird program, an alligator/crocodile show, and a snake program. During performances, the animal keepers discuss safety techniques, facts, and conservation efforts to aid in species survival.

Awards

USA Today Readers Choice Award, Best Attraction in South Dakota - 2017
Heritage Award, Prairie Family Business Assn. - 2017
SBA Family-Owned Business of the Year for South Dakota - 2010
Prairie Family Business Assn. Family Business of the Year – 2009
Tom Didier Excellence in Family Business Award – 2008
USA Today Top 10 Roadside Attractions In The Country – 2001
South Dakota Governors Service Award for Outstanding Commitment to Hospitality and Education in the Visitor Industry – 2003-2011
Midwest Travel Writers Association Gemmy Award – 1995
George S. Mickelson Award for Great Service to South Dakota Visitors - 1994
AAA GEM Designation Attraction
 	
Founder Earl Brock received the Ben Black Elk Award for lifetime achievement in promoting South Dakota tourism in 1982. His son, John Brock, Public Relations Director, received the same award in 2015.

See also

References

Buildings and structures in Rapid City, South Dakota
Zoos in South Dakota
Tourist attractions in Rapid City, South Dakota
1937 establishments in South Dakota
Zoos established in 1937